Dave Hudson (born 3 July 1946) is a South African sailor. He competed in the Flying Dutchman event at the 1992 Summer Olympics.

References

External links
 

1946 births
Living people
South African male sailors (sport)
Olympic sailors of South Africa
Sailors at the 1992 Summer Olympics – Flying Dutchman
Place of birth missing (living people)